The 1986 NCAA Division I softball tournament was the fifth annual tournament to determine the national champion of NCAA women's collegiate softball. Held during May 1986 to mark the conclusion of the 1986 NCAA Division I softball season, fifteen Division I college softball teams contested the championship. The tournament featured seven regionals of two teams (the last team, Creighton, qualified automatically) with the winner of each region (a total of 7 teams plus Creighton) advancing to the 1986 Women's College World Series at Seymour Smith Park in Omaha, Nebraska. Cal State Fullerton won the championship by defeating  1–0 in the final game.

Qualifying

Regionals

Cal State Fullerton qualifies for WCWS, 2–0

Indiana qualifies for WCWS, 2–0

Louisiana Tech qualifies for WCWS, 2–0

Texas A&M qualifies for WCWS, 2–0

Midwest Regional was not held
Creighton qualified as eighth team.

Northwestern qualifies for WCWS, 2–0

Long Beach State qualifies for WCWS, 2–0

California qualifies for WCWS, 2–1

Women's College World Series

Participants

Cal State Fullerton

Game results

Bracket

Game log

Championship Game

All-Tournament Team
The following players were named to the All-Tournament Team

See also
NCAA Division I Softball Championship
Women's College World Series
NCAA Division II Softball Championship
NCAA Division III Softball Championship
College World Series

References

1986 NCAA Division I softball season
NCAA Division I softball tournament